Gerber is a ghost town in Walker County, in the U.S. state of Georgia.

History
A post office called Gerber was established in 1880, and remained in operation until it was discontinued in 1895. G. Fred Gerber, the first postmaster, gave the community its name.

References

Geography of Walker County, Georgia
Ghost towns in Georgia (U.S. state)